Antos Gémes (born 29 April 1981, in Budapest) is a Hungarian actor who is a member of the Magyar Theatre.

Career
Antos Gémes was born on 29 April 1981, in Budapest.

He graduated in Leövey Klára music-time High School in 1999. During his high school years, he studied to be a composer. He plays several instruments, like guitar, piano and wind instruments. After his graduation, he tried many types of theatrical forms. For years he worked at Red Nose Clown Doctors Foundation in the role of Dr. Monokli.

He studied puppet acting at Academy of Drama and Film in Budapest from 2004 to 2008 as János Meczner's student. In the last year of his study, he became a scholar member from the Hungarian Actors Union of Magyar Theatre. Since 2010, he has been teaching acting at the school of the theatre.

Even during his academic years, he already had a music band, but in 2009 he founded Harmadik Figyelmeztetés (Third Calling) band where he is the singer. Besides his work in theatres he has been playing in several films and series. He was also featuring in a music clip and viral video series of Compact Disco. He was the protagonist of their clip.

Selected theater roles 
Áron Tamási: Ábel - Ábel
W. S. Gilbert: The Mikado - Pish-Tush
Bertolt Brecht: The Good Person of Szechwan - Yang Sun
Edmond Rostand: Cyrano de Bergerac - Christian
Cy Coleman: Sweet Charity - Oscar Lindquist
John Ford: 'Tis Pity She's a Whore - Bergetto
Terje Nordby: Isblomst - Andreas
Stephen Sondheim, James Lapine: Into the Woods - The Baker

Selected filmography 
2012, Marslakók (TV Series) - Óbester Antos
2013, Indián (film) - Lantos Tamás

References

Sources
 Magyar Theatre - Gémes Antos
 Antos Gémes http://topmovies.se/
 
 Hungarian Theater Database
 This article contains a translation of Gémes Antos from hu.Wikipedia.

External links

 Compact Disco - Sound Of Our Hearts (Official Video) Eurovision Song Contest 2012

1981 births
Living people
Hungarian male film actors
Hungarian male stage actors